Sovereign credit risk is the risk of a government becoming unwilling or unable to meet its loan obligations, as happened to Cyprus in 2013. Many countries faced sovereign risk in the Great Recession of the late-2000s. This risk can be mitigated by creditors and stakeholders taking extra precaution when making investments or financial transactions with firms based in foreign countries.

Five key factors that affect the probability of sovereign debt leading to sovereign risk are: debt service ratio,  import ratio, investment ratio, variance of export revenue, and domestic money supply growth. The probability of loss increases with increases in debt service ratio, import ratio, variance of export revenue and/or domestic money supply growth. Frenkel, Karmann, Raahish and Scholtens also argue that the likelihood of rescheduling decreases as investment ratio increases, due to resultant economic productivity gains. However, Saunders argues that debt rescheduling can become more likely if the investment ratio rises as the foreign country could become less dependent on its external creditors and so be less concerned about receiving credit from these countries/investors.

See also
 2012–2013 Cypriot financial crisis
 Credit rating
 List of countries by credit rating

References

Government debt